An Air Operations Center (AOC) is a type of command center used by the United States Air Force (USAF).  It is the senior agency of the Air Force component commander to provide command and control of air operations.

The United States Air Force employs two kinds of AOCs: regional AOCs utilizing the AN/USQ-163 Falconer weapon system that support geographic combatant commanders, and functional AOCs that support functional combatant commanders. When there is more than one U.S. military service working in an AOC, such as when naval aviation from the U.S. Navy (USN) and/or the U.S. Marine Corps (USMC) is incorporated, it is called a Joint Air Operations Center (JAOC). In cases of allied or coalition (multinational) operations in tandem with USAF or Joint air and space operations, the AOC is called a Combined Air Operations Center (CAOC).

An AOC is the senior element of the Theater Air Control System (TACS). The Joint Force Commander (JFC) assigns a Joint Forces Air Component Commander (JFACC) to lead the AOC weapon system.  If allied or coalition forces are part of the operation, the JFC and JFACC will be redesignated as the CFC and CFACC, respectively.

Quite often the Commander, Air Force Forces (COMAFFOR) is assigned the JFACC/CFACC position for planning and executing theater-wide air and space forces.  If another service also provides a significant share of air and space forces, the Deputy JFACC/CFACC will typically be a senior flag officer from that service.  For example, during Operation Enduring Freedom and Operation Iraqi Freedom, when USAF combat air forces (CAF) and mobility air forces (MAF) integrated extensive USN and USMC sea-based and land-based aviation and Royal Air Force (RAF) and Royal Navy / Fleet Air Arm aviation, the CFACC was an aeronautically rated USAF lieutenant general, assisted by an aeronautically designated USN rear admiral (upper half) as the Deputy CFACC, and an aeronautically rated RAF air commodore as the Senior British Officer (Air).

Divisions
There are five divisions in the AOC. These separate, but distinct, organizations fuse information that eventually becomes the Air Tasking Order.  Staffing of these divisions consists primarily of USAF officers of various specialities in the ranks of captain, major and lieutenant colonel, supported by a smaller cohort of enlisted airmen, typically in the rank of staff sergeant and above.  When conducting joint air and space operations, U.S. Army and USMC officers of similar rank and USN officers in the ranks of lieutenant, lieutenant commander and commander will also provide augmentative manning as required, the majority of whom will be aeronautically rated/aeronautically designated.  Senior leadership oversight of the AOC is provided by USAF colonels and general officers and USN captains and flag officers.

Strategy Division (SRD)
 Strategy Plans Team
 Strategy Guidance Team
 Operational Assessment Team
 Information Operations Team

Combat Plans Division (CPD)
 Target Effects Team
 Master Air Attack Plan Team
 Air Tasking Order Production Team
 Command and Control Planning Team

Combat Operations Division (COD)
 Offensive Ops Team
 Defensive Ops Team
 Personnel Recovery
 Senior Intelligence Duty Officer
 Joint Interface Control Officer
 Weather Specialty Team
 Naval Air Liaison Element (NALE)
 USN + USMC; NALE also provides personnel/support to CPD and ISRD

Intelligence, Surveillance, Reconnaissance Division (ISRD)
 Analysis, Correlation, and Fusion
 Targeting and Tactical Assessment
 ISR Operations

Air Mobility Division (AMD)
 AMD Chief
 Deputy AMD Chief
 Superintendent
 Air Mobility Control Team (AMCT)
 Execution Cell
 Mission Management
 Flight Management
 USAPAT Mission Planner
 Maintenance
 Airlift Control Team (ALCT)
 Airlift Plans
 DV Airlifts
 Diplomatic Clearance
 Requirements
 Air Refueling Control Team (ARCT)
 Aeromedical Evacuation Control Team (AECT)
 Unique Missions Support Team (AMDU)

Active Air Operations Centers

Inactive Air Operations Centers

AOC-equipping Units 

 102d Air Operations Group – Otis ANGB, Cape Cod, Massachusetts (Massachusetts Air National Guard) 
 103d Air Operations Group – East Granby, Connecticut (Connecticut Air National Guard) 
  193d Air Operations Group formally known as the 112th Air Operations Squadron – State College, Pennsylvania (Pennsylvania Air National Guard)
 152d Air Operations Group – Hancock Field ANGB, Syracuse, New York (New York Air National Guard)
  157th Air Operations Group – Jefferson Barracks, St Louis, Missouri (Missouri Air National Guard)
 183d Air Operations Group Capital Airport ANGS, Springfield, Illinois (Illinois Air National Guard)
 201st Air Operations Group - JB Pearl Harbor-Hickam, Hawaii (Hawaii Air National Guard)
 217th Air Operations Group – Kellogg ANGB, Battle Creek, Michigan (Michigan Air National Guard)
321st Air Mobility Operations Squadron – Travis AFB, California (Air Mobility Command)
349th Air Mobility Operations Squadron – Travis AFB, California (Air Force Reserve Command)
515th Air Mobility Operations Squadron – McGuire AFB, New Jersey (Air Force Reserve Command)
621st Air Mobility Operations Squadron – McGuire AFB, New Jersey (Air Mobility Command)
 701st Combat Operations Squadron – March ARB, California (Air Force Reserve Command)
 In addition to its augmentation role to PACAF's 607 AOC at Osan AB, South Korea, the 701 COS established its own AOC facility in the former Southwest Air Defense Sector at March ARB (established 2004) 
 710th Combat Operations Squadron – Langley AFB, Virginia (Air Force Reserve Command)

NATO CAOC
Since July 2013 The North Atlantic Treaty Organization (NATO) also uses the Combined Air Operations Centre concept at two locations (Torrejon, Spain and Uedem, Germany) with a deployable Air Operations Centre at Poggio Renatico, Italy. Previously, supporting the air component commands were 5 static Combined Air Operations Centres (CAOCs) to direct NATO air operations: in Finderup, Denmark; Eskişehir, Turkey; Larissa, Greece; Torrejon, Spain and Lisbon, Portugal.  There were 2 further CAOCs with a static as well as a deployable role; Uedem, Germany and Poggio Renatico. The static CAOCs can support Allied air operations from their fixed locations, while the deployable CAOC will move where they are needed.

See also
 Theater Battle Management Core Systems
 Global Command and Control System
 Air Force Command and Control Integration Center

References

 
Military electronics of the United States